Scandale Beck arises in Lake District National Park on Bakestones Moss, west of Kirkstone Pass, and flows south for much of its length of six and a half kilometers.

It flows under High Sweden Bridge, a 17th-century packhorse bridge, past High Sweden Coppice and Low Sweden Coppice, before turning west for a short distance north of Papermill Coppice, and turning south to join the River Rothay east of Ambleside. The Rothay flows only a short distance south before emptying into Windermere, the largest natural lake in England.

High head hydroelectric proposal
In August 2011, Ellergreen Hydro Ltd proposed a 900 kW high head hydroelectric scheme for Scandale Beck. Despite opposition for some quarters, for example, the Angling Trust, planning permission for the development was granted in April 2012.

References

External links
 Old Cumbria Gazetteer-Scandale Beck

Rivers of Cumbria
2Scandale